Saigon Television may refer to:

Vietnam Television, the national broadcaster for South Vietnam from 1966 to 1975
Ho Chi Minh City Television, formerly Saigon Liberation Television
Saigon Entertainment Television, Saigon TV, and Little Saigon TV, all subchannels of KJLA in Los Angeles